The 2020 Nippon Professional Baseball season was the 71st season of professional baseball in Japan since Nippon Professional Baseball (NPB) was reorganized in 1950. There were 12 NPB teams, split evenly between the Central League and Pacific League.

Season schedule
The 2020 season was originally scheduled to begin on 20 March, with a break from 21 July to 13 August, for the 2020 Tokyo Olympics. On 26 February 2020, the league announced that its remaining spring training games would be held without fans in attendance, due to the COVID-19 pandemic in Japan. With health related precautions in place, the media was allowed into some ballparks. Following another league meeting on 9 March, commissioner Atsushi Saito stated that the 2020 season would be postponed until April. Saito also said that the league aimed to retain a full regular season schedule of 143 games. This announcement marked the first time since 2011 that a Nippon Professional Baseball season was delayed.

On 18 April, the league announced that it would remain delayed indefinitely through the entirety of May, with the 18-game interleague schedule removed to accommodate a 125-game schedule. The delay of the 2020 Olympics meant that the three-week Olympic break would no longer be needed. Therefore, it was removed from the schedule. Before the league began play, the 2020 season was shortened to 120 games, and scheduled to end on 7 November. As a result of the condensed schedule, it was also announced that the First Stage of the Pacific League Climax Series would not be played, with the top two teams from the regular season competing in a best-of-5 Final Stage which the regular season winner enters with a one-game advantage. The Central League would do away with its Climax Series entirely, with its regular season winner advancing directly to the 2020 Japan Series.

With the lifting of states of emergency over major Japanese cities, NPB announced that it would begin its regular season on 19 June behind closed doors. "Warm-up" games began 26 May. All twelve NPB teams played on as scheduled on 19 June. On 10 July NPB began allowing a limited number of fans to attend games, with plans to further ease restrictions in the near future. On 19 September, attendance was expanded to a maximum of 20,000 fans per game, or 50% of stadium capacity.

Regular season standings

Climax Series

Pacific League

Japan Series

League leaders

Central League

Pacific League

Awards

Regular season

See also
2020 in baseball
2020 Major League Baseball season
2020 KBO League season
2020 Chinese Professional Baseball League season
Impact of the COVID-19 pandemic on baseball

Notes
1.The 2020 Central League Climax Series was cancelled. As a result, the regular season champion Yomiuri Giants advanced directly to the Japan Series.

References

 
Nippon Professional Baseball season
Nippon Professional Baseball season
Nippon Professional Baseball, 2020